Mecyna marioni is a moth in the family Crambidae. It was described by Hans Georg Amsel in 1957 and is found in Uzbekistan.

References

Moths described in 1957
Spilomelinae